Ronald G. "Ron" Cook (born 1948) is an English actor. He has been active in film, television and theatre since the 1970s.

Early and personal life 
Cook was born in 1948 in South Shields, County Durham, England, the son of a school cook and a car worker. When he was six his family moved to Coventry; he went to Wyken Croft Junior School and then Caludon Castle School and is a graduate of Rose Bruford College.

Career 
On stage, he appeared in the original 1988 production of Timberlake Wertenbaker's play Our Country's Good. He was nominated for a Laurence Olivier Award in the category of Best Supporting Actor in 2000 for his role in Juno and the Paycock at the Donmar Warehouse. 

He appeared in Conor McPherson's play The Seafarer, In 2008–2009, he took part in the Donmar's West End season at Wyndham's Theatre, playing Sir Toby Belch in Twelfth Night and Polonius in Hamlet. In 2011, he played The Fool in King Lear starring Derek Jacobi at the Donmar and on an 8-week tour. In 2013, Cook played the part of Pistol in Michael Grandage's Henry V (with Jude Law in the title role). From November 2015 to February 2016 he played Max in The Homecoming at Trafalgar Studios, and later appeared at the Donmar Warehouse as Teddy in Brian Friel's Faith Healer in 2016. From November 2016 to January 2017, Cook appeared in Lucy Kirkwood's new play The Children at The Royal Court Theatre with Francesca Annis and Deborah Findlay. In July 2017, he appeared as Dr Walker at The Old Vic in Girl from the North Country.

He has performed in a large number of television productions, including guest roles in episodes of series such as The Black Adder where he played "Sean the Irish bastard" (1983), and Bergerac (1988), Sharpe (1994)  and Doctor Who, "The Idiot's Lantern" (2006). He was in the BBC's The Complete Dramatic Works of William Shakespeare (1982–83), notably as Richard, Duke of Gloucester, later Richard III of England in Jane Howell's repertory treatment of the Henry VI plays and Richard III. He appeared as one of the unnamed "mysterious men" haunting the imagination of Michael Gambon's hospitalised writer in Dennis Potter's acclaimed 1986 serial The Singing Detective, Jack Rosenthal British television play Day To Remember'' and has featured in several costume dramas, including Stephen Poliakoff's The Lost Prince (2002 as David Lloyd George), an adaptation of The Hound of the Baskervilles (2002, as Barrymore), a TV adaptation of The Other Boleyn Girl, (2003 as Thomas Cromwell), Anthony Trollope's adaptation He Knew He Was Right (2004, as Bozzel), and Russell T. Davies's Casanova (2005, as the prisoner in the cell next to Casanova's). In 2003, he played the part of Doughty, Admiral Pellew's and later Hornblower's steward in the Hornblower. In 2006, Cook appeared as Kenneth Williams' agent Peter Eade in the BBC biopic Kenneth Williams: Fantabulosa!, also in 2006 he played the role of Mr Magpie in the Doctor Who episode "The Idiot's Lantern".

In 2003, he portrayed Victorian engineer Isambard Kingdom Brunel in the BBC's Seven Wonders of the Industrial World. In 2008, he played Mr Chivery in the TV serial Little Dorrit, based on the novel by Charles Dickens. He has also appeared in the children's TV series Summerhill, as an inspector. He played the role of an orthodox Jewish rabbi (Noach Marowski) in a 2008 edition of Silent Witness. He played the role of Hermann van Daan in the 2009 BBC drama, The Diary of Anne Frank, as well as the part of David Cockram in the ITV drama Whatever It Takes, aired in the same year. In late 2012 Cook played the role of Peter in the ITV series Mrs Biggs, a retired train driver, Ronnie Biggs befriends, employed by the gang to drive the hijacked train away during the Great Train Robbery. Cook played the company accountant, Mr Arthur Crabb, in the ITV series Mr Selfridge (2013 to 2016). In 2018 he portrayed a police chief in the BBC drama The City And The City. In 2019 he played television producer Bill Calder in Death in Paradise S8:E3, and later portrayed Borch Three Jackdaws in Netflix's The Witcher. In 2020 he played Stan Sturgess in the three-part fact-based BBC drama The Salisbury Poisonings, which portrays the 2018 Novichok poisoning crisis in Salisbury, England. Cook played the father of Dawn Sturgess who was the only fatality in the crisis. In 2022, Cook played the role of the ‘Wise Owl’ and its voice actor Wilf in the show “Inside No.9” in the episode “Wise Owl”.

He has played Napoleon Bonaparte twice, in his 1994 guest appearance in Sharpe and again in the 2000 feature film Quills. Other film roles have included parts in The Cook, the Thief, His Wife & Her Lover (1989, as Mews), Secrets & Lies (1996), The Odyssey (1997, as Eurybates), Topsy-Turvy (1999, as Richard D'Oyly Carte), Chocolat (2000), Charlotte Gray (2001), 24 Hour Party People (2002, as Derek Ryder), Thunderbirds (2004, as Parker), 102 Dalmatians, Hot Fuzz (2007, as George Merchant) and The King's Man (2021, as Archduke Franz Ferdinand). Cook also appeared in Feeling Good, a short film written by Dexter Fletcher and directed by Dalia Ibelhauptaite.

Cook has also acted in radio drama. In 2007 he played the part of confidence trickster Captain Wragge in a BBC Radio 4 adaption of the Wilkie Collins novel No Name. In July 2007, he played the part of Kris Kelvin, the protagonist psychologist on the BBC Radio 4 adaptation of Solaris, Stanislaw Lem's novel. In December 2014, he played Jacob Marley in Neil Brand's BBC Radio 4 adaptation of A Christmas Carol''.

Filmography

Film

Television

References

External links 
 

1948 births
Living people
20th-century English male actors
21st-century English male actors
Actors from County Durham
Actors from Coventry
Alumni of Rose Bruford College
English male film actors
English male Shakespearean actors
English male stage actors
English male television actors
People from South Shields
Male actors from Tyne and Wear
Royal Shakespeare Company members